Karen Anne Moxon is a Professor of Bioengineering at University of California, Davis and a specialist in  brain-machine-interfaces. She is best known for her neural engineering work, and is responsible for the first demonstration of a closed-loop, real-time brain machine interface system in rodent subjects, which was later translated to both non-human primates and humans with neurological disorders. She currently runs the Moxon Neurorobotics Laboratory at the University of California, Davis.

Biography 
She was born and raised on Long Island, and completed her undergraduate education studying Chemical Engineering at the University of Michigan. She completed her graduate studies at the University of Colorado, earning a Master's degree in Systems engineering and a Doctorate of Philosophy in Aerospace engineering in 1991 and 1994, respectively. She then became an Associate Professor at Drexel University in Philadelphia, Pennsylvania. She ultimately rose to the position of Associate Director for Research before leaving to lead research in the Bioengineering Department at University of California, Davis.

At Davis, she assumed a leadership role over a five year international research initiative that was awarded a $36 million grant by DARPA as part of its Bridging the Gap Plus program.

Public profile 
In 2015, she was a speaker at the 7th International IEEE EMBS Symposium on the Future of Brain Machine Interfaces. Her research on cortex-dependent recovery of unassisted hindlimb locomotion in rats was the subject of a 2017 Nature highlight. Moxon was a guest on the Dana Foundation's Cerebrum podcast in 2019. In May 2020, she was a guest on Melinda Garvey's See It to Be It podcast.

Select publications 

 Chapin, John K.; Moxon, Karen A.; Markowitz, Ronald S.; Nicolelis, Miguel A. L. (1999-07). "Real-time control of a robot arm using simultaneously recorded neurons in the motor cortex". Nature Neuroscience. 2 (7): 664–670. doi:10.1038/10223. ISSN 1546-1726. (Cited 1443 times, according to Google Scholar  ) 
 Talwar, Sanjiv K.; Xu, Shaohua; Hawley, Emerson S.; Weiss, Shennan A.; Moxon, Karen A.; Chapin, John K. (2002–05). "Rat navigation guided by remote control". Nature. 417 (6884): 37–38. doi:10.1038/417037a. ISSN 1476-4687. (Cited 461 times, according to Google Scholar.)  
 Priori, A.; Foffani, G.; Pesenti, A.; Tamma, F.; Bianchi, A. M.; Pellegrini, M.; Locatelli, M.; Moxon, K. A.; Villani, R. M. (2004-10-01). "Rhythm-specific pharmacological modulation of subthalamic activity in Parkinson's disease". Experimental Neurology. 189 (2): 369–379. doi:10.1016/j.expneurol.2004.06.001. ISSN 0014-4886. (Cited 469 times, according to Google Scholar.)

See also 
 Neuralink
 Brain–computer interface
 Neuroprosthetics

References

External links 
 Laboratory page

American bioengineers
Women bioengineers
Year of birth missing (living people)
Living people
People from Long Island
University of Michigan alumni
University of Colorado alumni